David Chambers, known by his professional pseudonym Blindboy Boatclub, is an Irish satirist, musician, podcaster, author, and TV presenter.

Boatclub is from Limerick and is best known as one half of the Irish comedy hip-hop group The Rubberbandits, who wear plastic shopping bags as masks to conceal their identities. He regularly discusses mental health, masculinity, and other socio-political issues.

Since 2017, he has been making The Blindboy Podcast, a podcast featuring interviews and coverage of social issues. He has also published two collections of short stories, and appeared on a number of television and podcast programmes. Between 2018 and 2019, he produced a BBC Three documentary series, Blindboy Undestroys the World.

Personal life 
David Chambers was born in Limerick in 1984, where he attended secondary school in Ardscoil Rís. While at school, he met Bob McGlynn and formed the satirical comedy pairing The Rubberbandits (performing under the pseudonyms "Blindboy Boatclub" and "Mr Chrome" respectively). Chambers later attended the Limerick School of Art and Design and in 2015 he earned his MA in Social Practice and the Creative Environment, which he'd say "It's an MA inside in the art college, which is perfectly suited for artists who work away from galleries, and tend to focus on society".

Chambers was diagnosed with autism in his 30s following comments from Blindboy Podcast listeners.

Podcast 
Originally touring and performing as part of a duo, Chambers (under the name Blindboy Boatclub) has produced a number of "solo" works, including a podcast which covers topics such as mental health, politics, culture, music, and history. In the Blindboy Podcast, Boatclub sometimes provides "hot takes" and social commentary alongside personal stories and "absurdist riffs". The podcast has also included interviews with people such as Bernadette Devlin McAliskey, Spike Lee, Emma Dabiri, Colm O'Gorman, Cillian Murphy and other comedians, activists and academics.

The podcast reportedly has 250,000 weekly listeners in Ireland and over a million worldwide listeners monthly. Boatclub has also played live tours of the podcast around Ireland and the UK, also touring in Australia, New Zealand, and Canada.

Twitch stream
Beginning in 2020, Boatclub began a regular Twitch stream, which to date has featured him playing Red Dead Redemption II, while also creating live music using a combination of guitars, keyboard, drums, cowbell and his own ad-libbed vocals, and interacting with fans. From January 2021, he reduced the stream to just Thursday evenings, in order to concentrate on other work.

Television 
Boatclub made a five-part documentary series called Blindboy Undestroys the World for BBC Three which explored contemporary issues in the UK. The 2018 pilot episode, which covered the housing system in the UK, was long-listed for a BAFTA award. This was followed by a four-part series in 2019 which looked at precarious employment, anxiety, the internet, and modern slavery.

Boatclub has also appeared on several Irish programmes, including The Late Late Show and The Tommy Tiernan Show. He has also appeared on Russell Brand's Under the Skin with Russell Brand and The Trews web series.

Books 
He has published two collections of satirical short stories:

References

External links 
 The Blindboy Podcast
 The Blindboy Twitch Stream

1984 births
Living people
Irish male singers
Irish male musicians
Irish satirists
Irish male comedians
Twitch (service) streamers
Masked musicians
People on the autism spectrum
Date of birth missing (living people)